The 'Directorate for Resource Management (DRM) located in Brussels, Belgium, is part of the Joint Research Centre, a Directorate-General of the European Commission (EC).

The mission of the Directorate for Resource management is to support the Joint Research Centre (JRC) Institutes to assure the optimal use of human and financial resources.

Institutes 
 Institute for Transuranium Elements (ITU)
 Institute for the Protection and the Security of the Citizen (IPSC)
 Institute for Environment and Sustainability (IES)
 Institute for Health and Consumer Protection (IHCP)
 Institute for Energy (IE)
 Institute for Prospective Technological Studies (IPTS)

See also 
 Directorate-General for Research (European Commission)

European Commission
European Union and science and technology